The 2023 Trafford Metropolitan Borough Council elections are scheduled to take place on 4 May 2023 alongside other elections in the United Kingdom . Due to boundary changes, all 63 seats are to be contested.

Background 
The Local Government Act 1972 created a two-tier system of metropolitan counties and districts covering Greater Manchester, Merseyside, South Yorkshire, Tyne and Wear, the West Midlands, and West Yorkshire starting in 1974. Manchester was a district of the Greater Manchester metropolitan county. The Local Government Act 1985 abolished the metropolitan counties, with metropolitan districts taking on most of their powers as metropolitan boroughs. The Greater Manchester Combined Authority was created in 2011 and began electing the mayor of Greater Manchester from 2017, which was given strategic powers covering a region coterminous with the former Greater Manchester metropolitan county.

Since its creation in 1974, the council has predominantly been controlled by the Conservative Party, with the Conservatives in power between 1973–85, 1988–94, and 2004–2018. The Labour Party was in control from 1996–2002, and from 2018 to the present. The rest of the time were periods of no overall control.

In December 2022 the leader of the council, Andrew Western was elected as Member of Parliament for Stretford and Urmston. Western stood down as council leader in January 2023, with Tom Ross subsequently being elected as leader.

In June 2022 the Local Government Boundary Commission for England made The Trafford (Electoral Changes) Order 2022, which officially abolished the existing 21 wards and created 21 new wards with different boundaries. Because of this change, all 63 seats on the council, three per ward, are to be contested.

Electoral process 
The election will take place using the plurality block voting system, a form of first-past-the-post voting, with each ward being represented by three councillors. The candidate with the most votes in each ward will serve a four year term ending in 2027, the second-placed candidate will serve a three year term anding in 2026 and the third-placed candidate will serve a one year term ending in 2024.

All registered electors (British, Irish, Commonwealth and European Union citizens) living in Trafford aged 18 or over will be entitled to vote in the election. People who live at two addresses in different councils, such as university students with different term-time and holiday addresses, are entitled to be registered for and vote in elections in both local authorities. Voting in-person at polling stations will take place from 07:00 to 22:00 on election day, and voters will be able to apply for postal votes or proxy votes in advance of the election.

Candidates 

Asterisks denote incumbent councillors seeking re-election.

Altrincham

Ashton upon Mersey

Bowdon

Broadheath

Brooklands

Bucklow-St Martins

Davyhulme

Flixton

Gorse Hill & Cornbrook

Hale

Hale Barns & Timperley South

Longford

Lostock & Barton

Manor

Old Trafford

Sale Central

Sale Moor

Stretford & Humphrey

Timperley Central

Timperley North

Urmston

References

Trafford
Trafford Council elections